The 2021–22 Auburn Tigers women's basketball team represents Auburn University during the 2021–22 NCAA Division I women's basketball season. The Tigers, led by first-year head coach Johnnie Harris, play their home games at Auburn Arena and compete as members of the Southeastern Conference (SEC).

Previous season
The Tigers finished the season 5–19 (0–15 SEC) to finish in last place in the conference. Head coach Terri Williams-Flournoy was not retained at the end of the season. Texas associate head coach Johnnie Harris was hired as her replacement on April 3, 2021.

Offseason

Departures

2021 recruiting class

Incoming transfers

Roster

Schedule

|-
!colspan=9 style=| Exhibition

|-
!colspan=9 style=| Non-conference regular season

|-
!colspan=9 style=| SEC regular season

|-
!colspan=9 style=| SEC Tournament

See also
2021–22 Auburn Tigers men's basketball team

References

Auburn Tigers women's basketball seasons
Auburn
Auburn Tigers
Auburn Tigers